Carlos Michel Lopes Vargas, or simply Michel Gaúcho (born May 18, 1982 in Porto Alegre) is a Brazilian right back currently playing for Juventude on loan from Cruzeiro.

Honours
Argentinian 3rd Division (2003/2004)

Contract
Juventude (Loan) 1 January 2007 to 31 December 2007
Cruzeiro 1 January 2007 to 31 December 2007

External links
 sambafoot
 CBF
 Guardian Stats Centre

1982 births
Living people
Brazilian footballers
São José Esporte Clube players
Sport Club Internacional players
Ferro Carril Oeste footballers
Cruzeiro Esporte Clube players
Ipatinga Futebol Clube players
América Futebol Clube (MG) players
Esporte Clube Juventude players
Association football defenders
Footballers from Porto Alegre